Boar may refer to:

Animals
Wild boar
Boar, adult male bear
Boar, adult male domestic pig
Boar, adult male of several other species;  see List of animal names
Iron Age pig, a pseudo-primitive breed of boar
Razorback, hybrid boar in North America
Boar, adult male guinea pig

Art, entertainment, and media
Boar (film), a 2016 Australian horror film
The Boar (newspaper), the student newspaper of the University of Warwick, England
The Boar (novel), a 1998 novel by Joe R. Lansdale
Boar the Fighter, a fictional character in Brian Jacques' Redwall series

Greek mythology
Calydonian Boar
Erymanthian Boar

Weapons
BOAR, the Bombardment Aircraft Rocket, an American nuclear weapon of the 1950s
Boar spear, a type of spear widely used in Germany and Scandinavia during the Roman era

Other
Boar, animal representation of Hai (亥) in the zodiac;  see Pig (zodiac)
Boars in heraldry

See also
Boer
Boor (disambiguation)
Bore (disambiguation)
Dzik (disambiguation)
Hog (disambiguation)
Pig (disambiguation)
Swine (disambiguation)